Wot, WOT, WoT or wot may refer to:

Acronyms
 War on Terror
 Weak operator topology in functional analysis
 Web of trust, a mechanism for authenticating cryptographic keys
 WOT Services, an online reputation service
 The Wheel of Time, a series of novels by Robert Jordan
 Web of Things, objects connected to the World Wide Web
 Wide open throttle, in an internal combustion engine
 Wojska Obrony Terytorialnej (Territorial Defence Force), Polish military reserve force
 World of Tanks, an online multiplayer war game

Other uses
 Wot, Nepal
 Wot (musical instrument), a circular panpipe in Laos and Thailand
 "Wot" (song), a 1982 single from Captain Sensible
 Currie Wot, a 1930s British aircraft
 Wat (food), an Ethiopian/Eritrean stew
 wot, internet slang for "what"

See also
WAT (disambiguation)
Watt (disambiguation)
What (disambiguation)
WOTS, a radio station in Kissimmee, Florida